Grant James (born August 17, 1987) is an American rower. He competed in the Men's eight event at the 2012 Summer Olympics, with his twin brother Ross.

References

External links
 

1987 births
Living people
American male rowers
Olympic rowers of the United States
Rowers at the 2012 Summer Olympics
People from Alamosa, Colorado
Sportspeople from Colorado
World Rowing Championships medalists for the United States
Twin sportspeople
American twins